"Girlfriend" is the first single from the collaborative album Face Off by rapper Bow Wow and R&B singer Omarion. The music video for "Girlfriend" starts off with a song titled "Can't Get Tired" playing in the background before "Girlfriend" begins. "Can't Get Tired" is also from their album Face Off.

The single was released to iTunes on October 30. The single debuted on the Billboard Hot 100 at number 82 and peaked at number 33.

This is the second song under the name "Girlfriend" that Omarion has recorded, following his previous song from 2003 as a member of B2K.

Remix
The official remix to the song features Swizz Beatz, Cassidy and Soulja Boy Tell 'Em with production by Swizz Beatz & the Individualz.

Charts

Weekly charts

Year-end charts

References 

2007 singles
2007 songs
Bow Wow (rapper) songs
Omarion songs
Song recordings produced by T-Pain
Songs written by Bow Wow (rapper)
Songs written by The-Dream
Songs written by Omarion